Darby station is a SEPTA Regional Rail station in Darby, Pennsylvania. It is located on the Northeast Corridor at 4th and Colwyn Streets, and serves the Wilmington/Newark Line.

The station sits just southeast from the Darby Transportation Center, a SEPTA bus and trolley terminal that is the terminus of Routes 11 and 13 of the SEPTA Subway–Surface Trolley Lines. There are no connections between the two stations.

Darby once had two other railroad stations. One, owned by the Baltimore and Ohio Railroad (now the Philadelphia Subdivision of CSX), sat at Main and Sixth Streets, where the SEPTA Route 11 trolley crosses today. The other, owned by the Pennsylvania Railroad, stood where the current station stands, and later across the tracks.

Station layout
Darby has two low-level side platforms with pathways connecting the platforms to the inner tracks.

References

External links
SEPTA – Darby Station
 4th Street entrance from Google Maps Street View

SEPTA Regional Rail stations
Stations on the Northeast Corridor
Railway stations in Delaware County, Pennsylvania
Darby, Pennsylvania
Wilmington/Newark Line